1-Decanol is a straight chain fatty alcohol with ten carbon atoms and the molecular formula C10H21OH.  It is a colorless to light yellow viscous liquid that is insoluble in water and has an aromatic odor. The interfacial tension against water at 20 °C is 8.97 mN/m.

Production
Decanol can be prepared by the hydrogenation of decanoic acid, which occurs in modest quantities in coconut oil (about 10%) and palm kernel oil (about 4%). It may also be produced synthetically via the Ziegler process.

Uses
Decanol is used in the manufacture of plasticizers, lubricants, surfactants and solvents. Its ability to permeate the skin has led to it being investigated as a penetration enhancer for transdermal drug delivery.

Safety
Like other medium chain fatty alcohols, 1-decanol is able to permeate the skin which can lead to irritation.

References

Fatty alcohols
Primary alcohols
Alkanols